Adrian Cristea (born 30 November 1983) is a Romanian retired professional footballer who played as a winger.

Club career
Adrian Cristea, nicknamed "Prințul" (The Prince), started his career in his hometown, Iași, playing in Divizia B for Politehnica Iași. After Politehnica won its promotion from Divizia B, Cristea made his Divizia A debut on 30 July 2004 in a 2–1 loss against Rapid București. After scoring 2 goals in 15 matches in the first half of the 2004–05 season, he was transferred to Dinamo București where he was wanted by coach Ioan Andone. He spent 7 seasons at Dinamo, appearing in 161 Liga I matches in which he scored 27 goals, winning a cup, a supercup and the Liga I 2006–07 title, also playing 31 matches in which he scored 4 goals in European competitions, helping the team reach the sixteenths-finals in the 2006–07 UEFA Cup where they were eliminated with 3–1 on aggregate by Benfica. In December 2010, Cristea was sold to Universitatea Cluj, for a total fee estimated by the Romanian press between €1.5 million and €2 million. After one year and a half in which he scored 11 goals in 42 Liga I matches, in the summer of 2012, he was transferred to Petrolul Ploiești, with 11 other players from Universitatea Cluj, when the owner of the Cluj team, left the club in order to take control of Petrolul. His first experience abroad came in 2013, when he went to play alongside fellow Romanian George Țucudean, being loaned to Standard Liège, where he was wanted by Mircea Rednic, a coach that worked with him at Petrolul and Dinamo. On 30 July 2013, after terminating his contract with Petrolul Ploiești, Cristea signed a two-year contract with fellow Romanian Liga I club Steaua București. However, Cristea failed to win a place in the first team, playing only 9 Liga I matches, scoring one goal and making 3 appearances in the 2013–14 Champions League, ending his contract with Steaua in April 2014. In September 2014, Cristea reached an agreement with Liga I team Concordia Chiajna, where he ended his career.

International career
Adrian Cristea played 9 games for Romania, making his debut on 7 February 2007 when coach Victor Pițurcă introduced him at halftime to replace Ovidiu Petre in a friendly which ended with a 2–0 victory against Moldova. His following game was a 3–0 victory against Luxembourg at the successful Euro 2008 qualifiers, also appearing in the second leg against Luxembourg, which ended with a 2–0 victory. In 2008, he was called by Victor Pițurcă in the squad for the 2008 European Championship, but didn't receive a chance to play. He played in a 1–1 against Austria and a 5–0 loss against Serbia at the 2010 World Cup qualifiers, making his last appearance for the national team in a 2–2 against Belarus at the Euro 2012 qualifiers.

On 25 March 2008, he was decorated by the president of Romania, Traian Băsescu, for his performance in the UEFA Euro 2008 qualifying Group G, where Romania managed to qualify to UEFA Euro 2008 Group C. He received Medalia "Meritul Sportiv" – ("The Sportive Merit" Medal) class III.

After retirement
After he ended his football career, Adrian Cristea worked as a fashion designer, opening a luxury clothing workshop in Bucharest.

Career statistics

Honours
Politehnica Iași
Divizia B: 2003–04
Divizia C: 2001–02
Dinamo București
Liga I: 2006–07
Cupa României: 2004–05
Supercupa Romaniei: 2005
Steaua București
Liga I: 2013–14

References

External links

1983 births
Living people
Sportspeople from Iași
Association football midfielders
Romanian footballers
FC Politehnica Iași (1945) players
FC Dinamo București players
FC Universitatea Cluj players
FC Petrolul Ploiești players
Standard Liège players
FC Steaua București players
CS Concordia Chiajna players
Liga I players
Liga II players
Belgian Pro League players
Romania international footballers
UEFA Euro 2008 players
Romanian expatriate footballers
Expatriate footballers in Belgium
Romanian expatriate sportspeople in Belgium